Clitoral erection is a physiological phenomenon where the clitoris becomes enlarged and firm.

Clitoral erection is the result of a complex interaction of psychological, neural, vascular, and endocrine factors, and is usually, though not exclusively, associated with sexual arousal. Erections should eventually subside, and the prolonged state of clitoral erection even while not aroused is a condition that could become painful. This swelling and shrinking to a relaxed state seems linked to nitric oxide's effects on tissues in the clitoris, similar to its role in penile erection.

Physiology 

The clitoris is the  homolog of the penis in the female. Similarly, the clitoris and its erection of it can subtly differ in size.

The visible part of the clitoris, the glans clitoridis, varies in size from a few millimeters to one centimeter and is located at the front junction of the labia minora (inner lips), above the opening of the urethra. It is covered by the clitoral hood.

Any type of motion can increase blood flow to this organ and this results in increased secretions which lubricate the vagina. There are many ways to stimulate the clitoris.

Clitoral erection occurs when the corpora cavernosa, two expandable erectile structures, become engorged with blood. This may result from any of various physiological stimuli, including sexual arousal. During sexual arousal, arterial blood flow to the clitoris is increased, and trabecular smooth muscle within the clitoris relaxes allowing blood to engorge the erectile tissues.  The ischiocavernosus and bulbospongiosus muscles contract to compress the dorsal vein of the clitoris to stop drainage of the clitoris, trapping the blood. More specifically, the clitoris has two adjoining erectile tissues corpus cavernosa (corpus cavernosa clitoridis) that form a main body that connects to the glans clitoridis. There is also a strip of erectile tissue (similar to the placement of the corpus spongiosum in males) running along the ventral surface of the corpus cavernosa main body that connects the glans clitoridis to the commissure of the vestibular bulbs. The main body of the corpus cavernosa with a ventral erectile tissue strip make up the shaft, which is connected to the glans clitoridis. The tunica albuginea is a fibrous-elastic sheath, that surrounds the shaft and glans clitoridis. The tunica albuginea does not surround the bulbs of the vestibule. The erectile tissues are composed of endothelium-lined vascular spaces in a trabecular matrix, with the endothelium-lined vascular spaces surrounded by smooth muscle capable of contraction and relaxation.

During sexual arousal, arterial blood flow to the clitoris is increased, and within the clitoris, the arteries further branch to supply the erectile tissues. The trabecular smooth muscles of the erectile tissue relax increasing blood flow to fill the vascular spaces, and expanding the erectile tissues until they are fully engorged with blood. The ischiocavernosus and bulbocavernosus muscles contract, compressing the dorsal vein of the clitoris.  This compression of the vein restricts drainage of the erectile structures, trapping the blood. This process stretches the tunica albuginea.  As a result, the clitoris becomes tumescent to accommodate the increased intracavernosous pressure. The tunica albuginea of the clitoris is made up of one layer making it more elastic than the tunica albuginea of the penis, which is composed of two layers. Erick Janssen (2007) elaborates on this reporting that "the corpora cavernosa of the clitoris are essentially similar to that of the penis except that there is no subalbugineal layer interposed between the tunica albuginea and the erectile tissue.  In the penis, this tissue engorges with blood during sexual arousal and becomes compressed against the unyielding tunica, creating penile rigiditya true erection.  The lack of this plexus in the clitoris indicates that while the organ can become tumescent or engorged, it cannot, like the penis, become stiffly erect. The clitoris thus does not become erect with sexual excitement, but engorged." In addition, the tunica albuginea around the glans is thinner than around the shaft in both the clitoris and penis. This gives the glans less firmness relative to the shaft. The extrusion of the glans clitoridis and thinning of the skin enhances sensitivity to physical contact. After a female has orgasmed, the erection usually ends, but this may take time.

Medical conditions

Clitoral priapism 

Priapism, while more common in males, is a condition that can also affect the clitoris. Symptoms include painful engorgement of the clitoris, swelling of the clitoris, and pain in the area around the clitoris.

In non-human animals 

Among capuchin monkeys, clitoral erection is possible and makes the clitoris more visible than in its relaxed state where it is hidden by a preputial fold.

See also  

 Biological functions of nitric oxide
 Camel toe
 Erection
 Sexual function

Notes

References  

 
 
 
 
 
 

Gynaecology
Sexual arousal
Clitoris